10th National Assembly may refer to:

 10th National Assembly of France
 10th National Assembly of Serbia
 10th National Assembly of South Korea
 10th National Assembly of Vietnam